Very (also known as Very.co.uk) is a British online retailer with headquarters in Speke, Liverpool. The brand was launched in the UK in July 2009 as part of the Shop Direct Group (now The Very Group) Very had formerly been known as Littlewoods Direct, and formerly Woolworths.co.uk.

History 

The original Littlewoods brand was a shopping catalogue and retail business headquartered in Liverpool, and was bought by the Barclay brothers in 2002. In 2009, Littlewoods Direct was rebranded as Very.co.uk, shifting its focus to online retailing and a younger market.
The website launched officially in July 2009. A year later a mobile enabled version of the site was launched, upgrading to include video and images in 2011. In the first quarter of 2013/14, mobile sales accounted for over a third of total online sales.

Partnerships and promotion 

Very makes extensive use of both celebrity endorsements and product placement on television and other media. Holly Willoughby and Fearne Cotton have acted as faces of the site, creating branded fashion collections and appearing in adverts. Other names who have worked with the brand include Jameela Jamil and Diana Vickers. In December 2013, former Girls Aloud member Kimberley Walsh became a celebrity designer for the brand. Michelle Keegan launched a fashion and homeware partnership with Very in October 2017.

Very has sponsored V music festival, also offering a delivery service to the festival sites in 2012. It has also sponsored Celebrity Big Brother on Channel 5, with branded, 'click-to-buy' product placement.

See also 

Littlewoods
Shop Direct
 Very Ireland

References

External links 
 

British companies established in 2009
Retail companies established in 2009
Internet properties established in 2009
2009 establishments in the United Kingdom
Companies based in Liverpool
Online retailers of the United Kingdom
Clothing retailers of England